Guðrún Arnardóttir (born 29 July 1995) is an Icelandic footballer who plays as a defender and has appeared for the Iceland women's national team.

In October 2021 she won the Damallsvenskan championship with FC Rosengård.

Early life
Guðrún was born to Ingibjörg María Guðmundsdóttir and Örn Torfason and grew up in Ísafjörður. She played football for BÍ's junior teams before moving to play for Selfoss in 2009 where she played her first senior team match in 2011.

National team career
Guðrún has been capped for the Iceland national team, appearing for the team during the 2019 FIFA Women's World Cup qualifying cycle.

References

External links
 
 
 
 
 
 

1995 births
Living people
Gudrun Arnadottir
Gudrun Arnadottir
Women's association football defenders
Gudrun Arnadottir
Gudrun Arnadottir
Expatriate footballers in Sweden
Gudrun Arnadottir
Gudrun Arnadottir
Damallsvenskan players
Santa Clara Broncos women's soccer players
UEFA Women's Euro 2022 players